Roccapipirozzi is an Italian village, hamlet (frazione) of the municipality of Sesto Campano in the Province of Isernia, Molise. As of 2009 its population was of 1,045.

History
The village, founded by the refugees from Venafro, was first mentioned as Rocca Piperocii in the 13th century. The fortification and the old town are well preserved.

Geography
Roccapipirozzi, located near the borders with Lazio and Campania, lies into a valley below the mounts Cesima, Calvello and Sambucaro. It is 6 km far from Sesto Campano, 5 km from  Venafro, 12 from San Pietro Infine, 26 from Isernia and 24 from Cassino. Nearest villages Vallecupa and Ceppagna, part of the municipality of Venafro.

The settlement is divided into 2 sides:
Roccapipirozzi Alta (i.e. :Upper R.) is the original and historic core of the village, located upon a hill. It counts a medieval castle and the population was of 217.  
Roccapipirozzi Bassa (i.e. :Lower R.), also known as Campopino or Masserie di Roccapipirozzi, is the newer side of the village, located in the plain below. Its population was of 828.

References

External links

 The Fortress of Roccapipirozzi
 Pictures of Roccapipirozzi

Frazioni of the Province of Isernia